In Praise of Older Women is George Kaczender’s twelfth feature film. It was written by Stephen Vizinczey (novel), Paul Gottlieb and Barrie Wexler. The story happens in Hungary during and after World War II but the movie was shot in Montreal, Quebec, Canada. The film was premiered at the Toronto Festival of Festivals on September 14, 1978.

Plot
András Vayda (Tom Berenger) grows up in a turbulent, war-torn Hungary, where he procures local girls for the occupying G.I.s during World War II. Disappointed by the girls his age, he meets Maya (Karen Black), a married woman in her 30s, who tutors him in love and romance. Maya is only the first of many mature women whom András will meet through his teenage and young adult life.

Cast 
 Tom Berenger as András Vayda
 Karen Black as Maya
 Susan Strasberg as Bobbie
 Helen Shaver as Ann MacDonald
 Marilyn Lightstone as Klari
 Alexandra Stewart as Paula
 Marianne McIsaac as Julika
 Alberta Watson as Mitzi
 Ian Tracey as Andras Vajda Jr
 Monique Lepage as The Countess
 Louise Marleau as Woman in Elevator
 Henry Ramer, Narrator (voice)

Reception
Before its release, the Ontario Film Review Board demanded the removal of a 35 second sex scene from the film. However, the original cut of the film was shown during the Toronto International Film Festival, and despite a subway strike and a rainstorm, hundreds of people waited outside the Elgin Theatre to see the film. According to some sources, counterfeit tickets were distributed, and a riot almost formed as ticket holders were turned away.

Accolades

Certification
Australia: R / Canada: 18A / Finland: K-18 / Iceland: 16 / Netherlands: 16 / Sweden: 15 / UK: 18 / USA: R

See also
 En brazos de la mujer madura (1997)

External links
 
 The New York Times review : http://movies.nytimes.com/movie/24525/In-Praise-of-Older-Women/overview

References

1978 films
1978 romantic drama films
Canadian coming-of-age drama films
English-language Canadian films
Films directed by George Kaczender
Films set in Hungary
Films set in Budapest
Films set in the 1950s
Films shot in Montreal
Canadian romantic drama films
1970s Canadian films